Inamura may refer to:

Inamura (surname), a Japanese surname
Mount Inamura, a mountain of Kōchi Prefecture, Japan
Inamura Dam, a dam in Tosa, Kōchi Prefecture, Japan